"Song to the Siren" is a song written by Tim Buckley to a poem by his writing partner Larry Beckett, released by Buckley on his 1970 album Starsailor. It was also later released on Morning Glory: The Tim Buckley Anthology, the album featuring a performance of the song taken from the final episode of The Monkees TV show which aired on March 25, 1968.

Pat Boone was the first to release a  recording of the song when it was featured on his 1969 album Departure, predating Buckley's album. However, the song has become perhaps Buckley's most famous due to a number of artists covering the song after his death in 1975, notably the British ensemble This Mortal Coil in 1983.

Background

The song was written in 1967, but Buckley was dissatisfied with the early attempts at recording it. It would finally appear on Starsailor three years later. In 1968, Buckley first performed the song in its original folk song style, with Buckley playing solo with a 12 string guitar, as a guest star on the series finale of The Monkees. This stands in contrast to the lusher, reverb-filled version present on the Starsailor album. The Monkees television spot features the song in the key of E while the later album version is played in Bb. The album version also features heavy reverb on the electric guitar and high pitched background vocals. In comparison, the live version is more lo-fi, with no effects, and Buckley's voice is accompanied only by his guitar. The 1968 performance also features different lyrics with the phrase "I am puzzled as the oyster" later being changed to "I'm as puzzled as the newborn child" in the album version. This was reportedly because when Buckley played the song to Judy Henske, wife of then producer Jerry Yester, she responded to the line with laughter.

Despite this, Buckley and Beckett regarded this song as their greatest collaboration effort, with Beckett later stating "It's a perfect match of melody and lyrics. There was some kind of uncanny connection between us."

The song's reference to the sirens tempting sailors at sea stems from Greek mythology. This lyrical style is an example of Larry Beckett's literary inspirations, and stands in direct contrast to Buckley's own more personal writing style.

Larry Beckett 
Beckett wrote the lyrics to "Song to the Siren" as part of his ongoing collaboration and friendship with Buckley throughout their high school years. Beckett has been working alongside the English musician, vocalist, and songwriter Stuart Anthony in a number of guises. The collaboration with Anthony began with the Lancaster-based band The Long Lost Band in 2014 when Beckett began contributing lyrics to their work. "Song to the Siren" formed part of their collaboration when Beckett visited the UK for two tour dates in 2015 - Liverpool and Lancaster. The live version of the song featured a spoken word part by Beckett explaining the origin of the lyrics, which was previously included in documentary footage with the author. Subsequently, a studio version of the song was recorded in 2016 to reflect the live rendition, making this recording somewhat special as (amongst the raft of cover versions) this is the first time the lyricist has appeared on the track. The Larry Beckett and The Long Lost Band version was released online on 21 October 2016. The song was also performed live by Stuart Anthony on the boat Odysseia, a replica Ancient Greek ship, setting sail from Lefkada. This rendition denotes a spiritual "home coming" for the song; the surroundings being thought to be Homer's Ithaca.

This Mortal Coil version

This Mortal Coil recorded a version of "Song to the Siren" that was released as a single in September 1983.  The single spent three weeks on the UK Charts where it peaked at no. 66 on October 23, 1983. Eventually, the single appeared for 101 weeks on the UK Indie Charts, a run that ranked fourth in the 1980s after three classic long-selling records: "Bela Lugosi's Dead" by Bauhaus (131 weeks), "Blue Monday" by New Order (186 weeks) and "Love Will Tear Us Apart" by Joy Division (195 weeks). "Song to the Siren" was included on the group's 1984 album It'll End in Tears which was released a year after the single.

This Mortal Coil was a loose collective of musicians under the leadership of producer Ivo Watts-Russell, and most of whom had recorded for the 4AD label. Singer Elizabeth Fraser and guitarist Robin Guthrie of the Cocteau Twins performed the new version of Buckley's song. Fraser also recorded a duet with Tim's son, Jeff Buckley, developing an intense personal relationship with him.

Following the release of the single by This Mortal Coil, Buckley's work experienced a reappraisal in the mid-1980s. This revival of interest in the artist would be one of the greatest factors in the increase of his posthumous sales, falling second only to the publicity generated by the success of his son, Jeff.

In 1992, the track 'Temple of Dreams' by Messiah contained a repeated sample of Frazer's vocals ("Did I dream you dreamed about me?").

The cover is featured prominently in David Lynch's 1997 film Lost Highway.

In 2009, the This Mortal Coil version of the song was featured in the supernatural fantasy film The Lovely Bones, to critical acclaim, having been chosen for the 1970s period piece story to reflect a passage of time from the film's 1973 initial setting in rural America to a 1980s era that had arrived over the years since main character Susie Salmon's murder.

In 2012 Dawn French selected this song on Desert Island Discs as, in her words, "The song that made me fall in love again". In 2021, the song featured on an episode of Soul Music, a music documentary series on BBC Radio 4.

Other versions
The 2021 director's cut Zack Snyder's Justice League includes a recording of "Song to the Siren" by UK singer/songwriter Rose Betts.

In 2023 HVPPY DEVTH'' covered "Song to the Siren"  featuring Bahadir Demiralay (Vocals), Roger Jarvis (Production, Song Writing, Programming), Nabil Kassem (Production, Song Writing, Programming, Mixing) and Rob Robinson (Mastering)and made a synth pop version of the song.

References

External links
Official Tim Buckley site
Song to the Siren on YouTube
List of Song to the Siren covers

1960s ballads
1969 songs
4AD singles
Folk ballads
Songs about oceans and seas
Songs written by Tim Buckley
Songs written by Larry Beckett
Classical mythology in music